D-Block Europe, often abbreviated to DBE, is a British hip hop collective consisting of Adam Nathaniel "Young Adz" Williams, Ricky Earl "Dirtbike LB" Banton and Lil Pino from Lewisham, London. Their name is a reference to The Lox (also known as D-Block). They started to put out tracks on their own label in the beginning of 2014. The group rose to fame in 2017 after releasing numerous singles including "Large Amounts", "Darling", "Nasty".

D-Block Europe's debut mixtape Any Minute Now, a collaborative project with British rapper from London Yxng Bane, was released in 2018 and charted at number 14 on the UK Albums Chart. Their debut solo mixtape, Home Alone, was released on 15 February 2019 and peaked at number 6 on the UK Albums Chart followed by their second mixtape of 2019, PTSD, which debuted at number 4 on the UK Albums Chart. Their debut album The Blue Print: Us vs. Them reached number two on the UK Albums Chart on 16 October 2020. Before their Central Cee collaboration (Overseas) debuted inside the Top 10 on 26 November 2021, D-Block Europe were the act with the most hits without a Top 10 managing to chart 29 singles
 into the UK Top 75 with none of them reaching the Top 10.

Discography

Studio albums

Mixtapes

Singles

As lead artist

As featured artist

Other charted and certified songs

Guest appearances

Filmography

Television

References

English hip hop groups
Black British musical groups
Hip hop collectives
Musical groups from the London Borough of Lewisham
British trap musicians